Zofia Tokarczyk (born 17 April 1963) is a Polish speed skater. She competed at the 1984 Winter Olympics and the 1988 Winter Olympics.

References

1963 births
Living people
Polish female speed skaters
Olympic speed skaters of Poland
Speed skaters at the 1984 Winter Olympics
Speed skaters at the 1988 Winter Olympics
Sportspeople from Nowy Sącz